is a Japanese semi-monthly seinen manga magazine published by Shueisha under their Jump line of magazines. Launched in November 2011 as a merging of Business Jump and Super Jump, it carried over nine series from the former and three from the latter in addition to beginning new titles.

History 
In July 2011, Shueisha announced they would be merging their seinen manga magazines Business Jump and Super Jump into a single biweekly magazine that fall. They cited the "changing environment for seinen manga and the changing tastes of readers" as their reason for the decision.

Targeted at "liberated adults," Grand Jump is published twice a month in a black and white saddle-stapled format, each issue running about 300 pages. The initial series at launch included 8 serializations carried over from Business Jump as well as 3 from Super Jump, with several new titles beginning. A monthly sister magazine called  was also launched, serializing the remaining Business Jump and Super Jump series.

Certain manga, such as Amai Siekatsu and Uramiya Honpo Reboot, were rebranded as Amai Siekatsu: Second Season and Uramiya Honpo Revenge. A few titles, including Mankitsu and Kei Toume's Sing Yesterday for Me, only appear in the magazine monthly.

After appearing only in the first issue, cooking manga Dashi Master was put on indefinite hiatus as Shueisha began investigating claims that the manga had plagiarized images of food found on Google Images.

A recent sequel to Hiroshi Motomiya's Ore no Sora was also carried over from Business Jump, and ended in Grand Jump in early Spring of 2012. In early summer of the same year, the magazine began serializing another title of Hiroshi's, his fourth installment in the Otokogi series.

Starting around issue 13 of 2012, My Night is as Beautiful as your Noon, one of the series launched with the start of the magazine, was moved from the magazine to join a group of several titles serialized exclusively online through Grand Jump'''s website.Grand Jump has published several oneshots, including two spinoffs of famed artist Go Nagai's Cutie Honey. It is also home to the latest series by renowned seinen manga artist Toshiki Yui, Saikin kono sekai wa watashi dali no mono ni narimashita.....

In February 2013, the magazine began moving several popular titles from Grand Jump Premium to Grand Jump. One Grand Jump series, Get Big Money, was moved to Premium. In 2018, Grand Jump Premium was rebranded as Grand Jump Mucha.

 Features 
 Series from Grand Jump 
There are currently twenty manga titles being regularly serialized in Grand Jump.

 Series from Grand Jump Mucha 
There are currently nine manga titles being regularly serialized in Grand Jump Mucha.

 Series from Grand Jump Mecha
There are currently seven series being regularly serialized in Grand Jump Mecha''.

References

External links 
 

2011 establishments in Japan
Magazines established in 2011
Shueisha magazines
Seinen manga magazines